Zula, pronounced Zoo-lah (noun), is a mobile application designed to enable work communication. It was founded in late 2013 by Jeff Pulver, Co-Founder of Vonage and Angel investor at Twitter and Jacob Ner-David, Co-Founder of Deltathree.

Zula's aim is to help teams communicate effectively.

The pricing model is freemium, as larger teams of more than 18 mates will need to upgrade for a group chat or recording conference calls. In the future, Zula plans to allow custom Apps to be built upon its platform, allowing companies to have a tailor-made collaboration experience.

Zula was named "WhatsApp For Business",

In Feb 2015, Fast Company listed Zula as one of "The World's Top 10 Most Innovative Companies of 2015 in Israel", placing the app in the ninth position.

TechCrunch Disrupt 
Zula has won the Audience Choice Awards at TechCrunch Disrupt. The final list of nominated startups included 70 companies and Zula was elected to showcase the product.

Company Executives 
In January 2015, Raz Yalov was appointed Chief Executive Officer. He succeeds Jacob Ner-David, who founded Zula along with Jeff Pulver, as part of a transition plan to focus heavily on product execution. Yalov is a veteran hi-tech executive and hands-on engineer, with over 20 years of experience in building and launching enterprise software products.

The Chief Marketing Officer is Hillel Fuld.

References

External links
 

Mobile software